The 1876 Illinois gubernatorial election was the sixteenth election for this office. Representative Shelby Moore Cullom narrowly defeated businessman Lewis Steward for the Governorship of Illinois. This was the narrowest victory for a Republican Governor since 1856, when William H. Bissell narrowly won the office in a plurality. Cullom's victory was the sixth consecutive victory for the Republican Party. Cullom also slightly overperformed Republican candidate Rutherford B. Hayes in the concurrent Presidential election.

Republican Andrew Shuman was elected Lieutenant Governor of Illinois. At this time in Illinois history, the Lieutenant Governor was elected on a separate ballot from the governor. This would remain so until the 1970 constitution.

Results

References
Our Campaigns – Illinois Governor Race – Nov 6, 1876

Gubernatorial
1876
Illinois
Illinois gubernatorial election